Corrected Slogans is a studio album collaboration between the experimental rock band Red Krayola and the conceptual art group Art & Language. It was released in 1976 by the publisher Music-Language. The album was adopted by Drag City and was re-issued on CD in 1997. The album was mostly recorded between 1974 and 1975.

Critical reception
Magnet called Correct Slogans "a mostly acoustic album of strange, politically charged pieces that sometimes border on opera." The Dallas Observer wrote that the album matches "skeletal backing by Thompson and 16-year-old drummer Jesse Chamberlain ... with Art & Language's dry, unsingerly voices and their intentionally antilyrical lumps of Marxist art theory."

Track listing

Personnel 
Art & Language – production, mixing
Jesse Chamberlain – drums
Colin Bateman – engineering, mixing, recording
Thomas Duffy – engineering, mixing, recording
Doug Pomeroy – engineering, recording
The Red Crayola – production
Stewart Romain – mastering
Wieslaw Woszczyk – engineering, mixing

References

External links 
 

1976 albums
Drag City (record label) albums
Red Krayola albums